The striated wren-babbler (Ptilocichla mindanensis) is a species of passerine bird in the family Pellorneidae. It is endemic to the Philippines. Its natural habitats are subtropical or tropical moist lowland forest and subtropical or tropical moist montane forest.

References

Further reading

Collar, N. J. & Robson, C. 2007. Family Timaliidae (Babblers)  pp. 70 – 291 in; del Hoyo, J., Elliott, A. & Christie, D.A. eds. Handbook of the Birds of the World, Vol. 12. Picathartes to Tits and Chickadees. Lynx Edicions, Barcelona.

striated wren-babbler
Endemic birds of the Philippines
striated wren-babbler
striated wren-babbler
Taxonomy articles created by Polbot